The 2017 Lincolnshire County Council election took place in non-metropolitan Lincolnshire on 4 May 2017 as part of the 2017 local elections in the United Kingdom. A total of 70 councillors were elected across the seven non-metropolitan districts that make up the administrative county of Lincolnshire from 70 single member electoral divisions by first-past-the-post voting for a four-year term of office. The election did not include North Lincolnshire and North East Lincolnshire as they are separate unitary authorities.

All locally registered electors (British, Irish, Commonwealth and European Union citizens) who were aged 18 or over on Thursday 4 May 2017 were entitled to vote in the local elections. Those who were temporarily away from their ordinary address (for example, away working, on holiday, in student accommodation or in hospital) were also entitled to vote in the local elections, although those who had moved abroad and registered as overseas electors cannot vote in the local elections. It is possible to register to vote at more than one address (such as a university student who had a term-time address and lives at home during holidays) at the discretion of the local Electoral Register Office, but it remains an offence to vote more than once in the same local government election.

The result saw Conservatives led by Leader of the Council Martin Hill achieve a landslide of seats, retaking control of the council, winning 58 out of the 70 seats giving them a majority of 46 over all other parties and leaving 12 councillors in opposition. The result saw the main former opposition of UKIP councillors wiped out, Labour lost four seats and the Lincolnshire Independents were reduced to just a single seat.

Boundary Changes
The Local Government Boundary Commission for England undertook a review of the county in 2016 and recommended a change to the boundaries of the electoral divisions, as well as reducing the number of county councillors by 7 to 70. These changes took effect at the May 2017 election.

Overall Results

Results by electoral division

Borough of Boston
(6 seats, 6 electoral divisions)

Boston Coastal

Boston North

Boston Rural

Boston South

Boston West

Skirbeck

East Lindsey 
(13 seats, 13 electoral divisions)

Alford & Sutton

Horncastle & the Keals

Ingoldmells Rural

Louth North

Louth South

Louth Wolds

Mablethorpe

Saltfleet & the Cotes

Skegness North

Skegness South

Tattershall Castle

Wainfleet

Woodhall Spa & Wragby

City of Lincoln 
(8 seats, 8 electoral divisions)

Birchwood

Boultham

Carholme

Ermine & Cathedral

Hartsholme

Park

St Giles

Swallow Beck & Witham

North Kesteven
(11 seats, 11 electoral divisions)

Bassingham & Welbourn

Eagle & Hykeham West

Heckington

Hykeham Forum

Metheringham Rural

Potterhanworth & Coleby

Ruskington

Sleaford

Sleaford Rural

Waddington & Hykeham East

Washingborough

South Holland 
(9 seats, 9 electoral divisions)

Crowland

Donington Rural

Holbeach

Holbeach Rural

Spalding East

Spalding Elloe

Spalding South

Spalding West

The Suttons

South Kesteven 
(14 seats, 14 electoral divisions)

Bourne North & Morton

Bourne South & Thurlby

Colsterworth Rural

Deepings East

Deepings West & Rural

Folkingham Rural

Grantham Barrowby

Grantham East

Grantham North

Grantham South

Grantham West

Hough

Stamford East

Stamford West

West Lindsey
(9 seats, 9 electoral divisions)

Bardney & Cherry Willingham

Gainsborough Hill

Gainsborough Rural South

Gainsborough Trent

Market Rasen Wolds

Nettleham & Saxilby

North Wolds

Scotter Rural

Welton Rural

References

2017
2017 English local elections
2010s in Lincolnshire